Cex or CEX may refer to:

 Cex (musician), musical project run by Rjyan Claybrook Kidwell
 CeX (company), a second hand retailer based in the UK
 Consumer Expenditure Survey, in the United States